RMS Rhone was a UK Royal Mail Ship owned by the Royal Mail Steam Packet Company (RMSP). She was wrecked off the coast of Salt Island in the British Virgin Islands on 29 October 1867 in a hurricane, killing 123 people. She is now a popular Caribbean wreck dive site.

History

RMSP ships carried mail, passengers, horses, and cargo on regular scheduled routes. Its first services had been between Southampton and the Caribbean, but in 1851 it added a new route between Southampton and Rio de Janeiro. This growing trade, and a number of ships lost at sea, created a need for new ships.

In June 1863 RMSP ordered Rhone from the Millwall Iron Works on the Isle of Dogs, London and her sister ship  from Caird & Company in Greenock. The pair was initially to work the Rio de Janeiro route. They were similar but not identical. Both were handsome ships, but Rhone was considered to have slightly finer lines.

At this time the Admiralty supervised Royal Mail Ship contracts. During building the Admiralty surveyor criticised Rhones bulkheads and water tight compartments. Revisions were made, and the ship was completed to the surveyor's satisfaction.

She was a sail-steamer, rigged as a two-masted brig. In her contract the ship cost £25 17s 8d per ton and her engine cost £24,500.

Rhone was an innovative ship. She had a bronze propeller, which was only the second ever made of this alloy. She had also a surface condenser in order to save and re-use water in her boilers and steam engine. She was the first ship so equipped to visit Brazil, so in port in 1865 the Emperor of Brazil, Pedro II, came aboard and visited her engine room to see it.

Rhones passenger capacity was 253 first class, 30 second class and 30 third class. On 9 October 1865 she left Southampton on her maiden voyage to Brazil. At first she suffered from overheated bearings, but once this was resolved she became a fast and reliable ship. Her next five voyages were also to Brazil.

Rhone proved her worth by weathering several severe storms. One storm in 1866 destroyed the cutter and two lifeboats on her port side, damaged the cutter and the mail boat on her starboard side, damaged much of her deck furniture, killed two horses and broke one sailor's leg.

In January 1867 Rhone made her final voyage to Brazil, after which RMSP transferred her to the Caribbean route, which at the time was more lucrative and prestigious.

Sinking

On 19 October 1867 Rhone drew alongside RMS Conway in Great Harbour, Peter Island for bunkering. The original coaling station they needed had been moved from the then Danish island of St. Thomas due to an outbreak of yellow fever.

On the day of the sinking, Rhones Master, Frederick Woolley, was slightly worried by the dropping barometer and darkening clouds, but because it was October and hurricane season was thought to be over, Rhone and Conway stayed in Great Harbour. The storm which subsequently hit was later known as the San Narciso Hurricane and retrospectively categorised as a Category 3 hurricane on the Saffir–Simpson Hurricane Scale. The first half of the storm passed without much event or damage, but the ferocity of the storm worried the captains of Conway and Rhone, as their anchors had dragged and they worried that when the storm came back after the eye of the storm had passed over, they would be driven onto the shore of Peter Island.

They decided to transfer the passengers from Conway to the "unsinkable" Rhone; Conway was then to head for Road Harbour and Rhone would make for open sea. As was normal practice at the time, the passengers in Rhone were tied into their beds to prevent them being injured in the stormy seas.

Conway got away before Rhone but was caught by the tail end of the storm, and eventually foundered off the south side of Tortola. But Rhone struggled to get free as her anchor was caught fast. It was ordered to be cut loose, and lies in Great Harbour to this day, with its chain wrapped around the same coral head that trapped it a century and a half ago. Time was now critical, and Captain Woolley decided that it would be best to try to escape to the shelter of open sea by the easiest route, between Black Rock Point of Salt Island and Dead Chest Island. The Captain took a conservative course, giving Blonde Rock (which cannot be seen from the surface) a wide berth.

The winds shifted to the opposite direction and Rhone was thrown directly into Black Rock Point. It is said that the initial lurch of the crash sent Captain Woolley overboard, never to be seen again. Local legend says that his teaspoon can still be seen lodged into the wreck itself. Whether or not it is his, a teaspoon is clearly visible entrenched in the wreck's coral. The ship broke in two, and cold seawater made contact with her hot boilers which had been running at full steam, causing them to explode.

Of the approximately 145 crew and passengers on board, twenty-five people survived the wreck. The bodies of many of the sailors were buried in a nearby cemetery on Salt Island which remained relatively unchanged until being destroyed by Hurricane Irma in 2017. A long held belief that due to her mast sticking out of the water, and her shallow depth, she was deemed a hazard by the Royal Navy in the 1950s and her stern section was blown up, was refuted by Twice She Struck author Dr. Michael D. Kent. Kent's research indicated that Rhone was blown up during salvage by hardhat diver Jeremiah Murphy and that the bow section, made famous by Jacqueline Bisset, had probably rolled during another hurricane in 1924.

As dive site

Rhone is now a popular dive site, and the area around her was turned into a national park in 1980.

Rhone has received a number of citations and awards over the years as one of the top recreational wreck dives in the Caribbean, both for its historical interest and teeming marine life, and also because of the open and relatively safe nature of the wreckage. Very little of the wreckage is still enclosed, and where overhead environments do exist, they are large and roomy and have openings at either end permitting a swim through, so there is no real penetration diving for which divers usually undergo advanced training.

Her bow section is still relatively intact, and although the wooden decks have rotted away, she still provides an excellent swim-through for divers. Her entire iron hull is encrusted with coral and overrun by fishes (and the local barracuda named Fang), and the cracks and crevices of her wreckage provide excellent habitats for lobsters, eels, and octopuses. Her wreckage was also featured in the 1977 filming of The Deep, including the scene of Jacqueline Bisset diving in a T-shirt.

The wreck has been well treated over the years. In recent decades the largest of these were stolen by a collector, leaving only the smaller wrenches. Also remaining are a few brass portholes and even a silver teaspoon. The remaining wrenches are under  of water. Similarly the wreck features the "lucky porthole", a brass porthole in the stern section which survived the storm intact and remains shiny by divers rubbing it for good luck. This porthole is considered "lucky" because the glass still survives. For many years a popular resident of the wreck was a  Goliath grouper also known as a Jew fish, but two ex-pat fishermen with spear guns killed it despite spear guns being illegal for non-nationals and the area being a national park. Today the wreck is visited by hundreds of tourists every day, most of whom are more circumspect in their treatment of the site.

The Rhone National Park was closed for a short time from 29 August 2011 because the container ship Tropical Sun had run aground on rocks near Salt Island very near the wreck.

Pictures

References

Sources
 
 
 Martelli, Joan (2017) The Law of Storms: The true story of the RMS Rhone and the great Virgin Islands hurricane of 1867.

External links

 The R.M.S. Rhone is an old cargo vessel that wrecked in 1867 at a reef at Salt Island, greatestdivesites.com
 RMS Rhone BVI 2000, wreck dive video at YouTube
 RMS Rhone, Salt Island, British Virgin Islands, wreck dive video at YouTube
 The Deep Filming Locations exactly where on RMS Rhone the 1977 movie The Deep was filmed.

 

1865 ships
Maritime incidents in October 1867
Ships of the Royal Mail Steam Packet Company
Shipwrecks of the British Virgin Islands
Wreck diving sites
Protected areas established in 1980
1980 establishments in the British Virgin Islands
1867 in the British Virgin Islands
Underwater diving sites in the Caribbean